Willy Fog 2 is a Spanish animated television adaptation of the novels Journey to the Center of the Earth and Twenty Thousand Leagues Under the Sea by Jules Verne, with the characters from Around the World with Willy Fog, produced by Spanish studio BRB Internacional and Televisión Española that was first broadcast on La 2 between 24 September 1994 and January 1995.

Background
Due to the success of Around the World with Willy Fog, BRB Internacional and Televisión Española revisited the franchise ten years later, with animation by Wang Film Productions in Taiwan and Shanghai Morning Sun Animation in China, released a sequel series simply titled "Willy Fog 2". The series ran to 26 episodes, and consisted of two separate serialized stories that were based on the original novels.

The first was Journey to the Center of the Earth, which played out very similarly to the first series. Again a bet was made with Sullivan – and he sent Transfer to cause havoc. This time, however, more people believed in Willy Fog, although all of them (apart from Lord Guinness) turned against him at times – when reports came back that the volcano they journeyed into was about to erupt. Romy, Tico and Rigodon went with Willy on the voyage again and were joined by Professor Lidenbrock – an expert in archeology and Hans – an Icelandic who acted as a general dogsbody. The team again made it – just in time to win the bet.

The second story was adapted from Twenty Thousand Leagues Under the Sea, and was completely different from the other two. Willy was invited to help investigate strange events as several ships had been attacked by what seemed to be a sea monster. Willy, Romy, Rigodon and Tico went, although soon the ship they were on was invaded and they, alongside Ned the harpoonist and Professor Aronnax, were kidnapped by the mysterious Captain Nemo. After having adventures under the sea, they finally escaped.

As production occurred in Taiwan and China, the Japanese studio who made the first series, Nippon Animation, was not involved in Willy Fog 2, as is clearly evidenced in its much flatter, brighter, less-nuanced animation. The series re-used the De Angelis's opening theme, with new lyrics to reflect the change of premise, and employed the lyrical version of "Romy" as a closing theme. The series was dubbed into English by the London-based company Village Productions, Ltd, which had worked on dubs of several other contemporary BRB shows, such as Sandokan. Although the voice cast was entirely new, the group clearly drew upon the Intersound dub of the original series as a source upon which to base the character voices.

Home entertainment releases
In 1995, BRB Internacional released three Willy Fog movies – Around the World in 80 Days, Journey to the Center of the Earth and 20,000 Leagues Under the Sea – each one created by heavily editing the first series from roughly 650 minutes in total down to a truncated 75 minutes apiece. All three films were dubbed by Village Productions, who had previously dubbed the second series for the United Kingdom, and later reached the United States on DVD. Notably, the Village Productions dub for the first movie was able to secure use of Intersound's English-language version of the theme tune.

Finnish 
Songs in the Finnish dub were sung by the actors of YLE Import 2021 re-using the De Angelis's music but with new Finnish lyrics. In the Finnish dub some scenes are cut, which includes musical numbers in some episodes.

English 
Around 2016, the English dubs of all episodes of the series was uploaded to the official channel of BRB Internacional on YouTube.

References

External links
BRB Internacional website

Television series set in the 1870s
Television shows based on Twenty Thousand Leagues Under the Sea
Period television series
RTVE shows
Spanish children's animated adventure television series
1995 Spanish television series debuts
Animated television series about lions
Animated television series about cats
Fictional panthers